Yenka is a suite of educational software products which allows students to simulate scientific experiments, create mathematical models, design electronic circuits or learn computer programming. Yenka is developed by Crocodile Clips Ltd. The software is based around a variety of subjects such as computer programming and chemistry.

Features 
Yenka uses a unified interface to model reactions in scientific and technological subject areas, often in 3D. The software is intended to display results in real time or simulated time at 0.1x or 10x speed, replicating actual results (for example, a completed circuit will illuminate a light-emitting diode (LED), but applying too much electric current will destroy it). Yenka also allows educators to design lessons and interactive content for students.

References 

Educational software
Educational software companies
Science education software
Software for children